John Brindley (April 18, 1850 – February 11, 1926) was an American jurist and politician.

Born on a farm near Boscobel, Grant County, Wisconsin, Brindley graduated from University of Wisconsin in 1874. He was principal of grade and high schools in Lone Rock. Lancaster, and Boscobel, Wisconsin. In 1879 and 1880, Brindley served in the Wisconsin State Assembly and was a Republican. In 1880, Brindley moved to La Crosse, Wisconsin and practiced law. He was the La Crosse city attorney. From 1897 until his death in 1926, Brindley served as county judge for La Crosse. Brindley died in La Crosse  after a long illness.

Notes

1850 births
1926 deaths
People from Boscobel, Wisconsin
Politicians from La Crosse, Wisconsin
University of Wisconsin–Madison alumni
Educators from Wisconsin
Wisconsin lawyers
Wisconsin state court judges
Republican Party members of the Wisconsin State Assembly
19th-century American lawyers